A Long Ride from Hell (Italian: Vivo per la tua morte, lit. "I live for your death") is a 1968 Spaghetti Western film directed by Camillo Bazzoni. It is based on the novel Judas Gun by Gordon D. Shirreffs. The film was bodybuilder Steve Reeves' final film prior to his retirement. Reeves, who turned down the lead of A Fistful of Dollars financed and co-wrote the film himself upon seeing the successful box office returns of the Clint Eastwood spaghetti westerns at the time.  The film did poorly and Reeves retired from filmmaking that year.

Plot
Reeves portrays cowboy Mike Sturges, who, along with his younger brother, Roy, is sentenced to Yuma Territorial Prison on a trumped-up train robbery charge. Both endure cruel treatment before Mike escapes to exact revenge on their enemies.

Cast
 Steve Reeves - Mike Sturges
 Wayde Preston - Marlin Mayner
 Guido Lollobrigida - Deputy Sheriff Harry
 Domenico Palmara - Sheriff Max Freeman
 Silvana Venturelli - Ruth Harper
 Giovanni Pazzafini - Bill Savage
 Ivan Scratuglia - Roy Sturges
 Rosalba Neri - Encarnacion
 Spartaco Conversi - Bobcat Bates
 Franco Balducci - Mason
 Bruno Corazzari - Shorty
 Franco Fantasia - Castleman
 Aldo Sambrell - Mexican bounty hunter
 Silvan Bacci - Felicias
 Mario Maranzana - Naco bartender
 Emma Baron Cerlesi - Mrs. Sturges
 Enzo Fiermonte

Releases
Wild East originally released this in a limited edition R0 NTSC DVD in 2008. In 2011 Code Red, after settling a distribution rights dispute with Wild East, re-released the film with Wild East's special features, an interview with Mimmo Palmara and a feature with Steve Reeves. Both are out-of-print.

References

External links
 

1968 films
1968 Western (genre) films
Spaghetti Western films
Films directed by Camillo Bazzoni
Films scored by Carlo Savina
Films based on Western (genre) novels
Films based on American novels
Films shot in Almería
1960s Italian-language films
1960s Italian films